The M Countdown Chart is a record chart on the South Korean Mnet television music program M Countdown. Every week, the show awards the best-performing single on the chart in the country during its live broadcast.

In 2015, 30 singles ranked number one on the chart and 25 music acts were awarded first-place trophies. Four songs collected trophies for three weeks and achieved a triple crown: "Sniper" by Shinhwa, "Call Me Baby" by Exo, "Lion Heart" by Girls' Generation and "I" by Taeyeon. No release for the year earned a perfect score, but "Lion Heart" acquired the highest point total on the September 3 broadcast with a score of 10,988.

Scoring system

February 27, 2014–June 4, 2015
Songs that appeared on the show from January 1–June 4 were scored based on a combination of digital single sales (50%), album sales (10%), social media performance (official YouTube music video views and SNS buzz: 10%), preference points (global fan votes and age range preference: 10%), Mnet's broadcast score (10%), and SMS votes (10%), for a total of 11,000 points.

June 11, 2015–April 12, 2018
Mnet changed its scoring system effective the June 11 broadcast. Digital sales still accounted for 50% of a song's score, but points for album sales and social media performance were increased to 15% each. The popularity, broadcast, and voting percentages remained unchanged. No song achieved a perfect score under either system for the year.

Chart history

References 

2015 in South Korean music
2015 record charts
Lists of number-one songs in South Korea